Comuneros is a station on the TransMilenio mass-transit system of Bogotá, Colombia.

Location
The station is located on Avenida NQS between Calles 3 and 5A, south of downtown Bogotá.

History
The station opened in 2005 as part of the second line of phase two of TransMilenio construction, opening service to Avenida NQS. It is so named due to its proximity to the Avenida de los Comuneros (Calle 6ª).

Station services

Old trunk services

Main line service

See also
List of TransMilenio Stations

TransMilenio